Coming Up may refer to:

Coming Up (album), by Suede
"Coming Up" (song), by Paul McCartney
San Francisco Bay Times, LGBT newspaper previously named COMING Up!
Coming Up (TV series), British TV series first shown 2003